Anime Boston is an annual three-day anime fan convention held in the spring in Boston, Massachusetts, United States. Anime Boston was created and is run by the New England Anime Society, Inc., a Massachusetts-based non-profit organization.

Programming 
The convention features a number of events which include a masquerade, an anime music video contest, video programming rooms, an artists' alley and art show, karaoke, game shows, swap meets, Anime Unscripted, video games, RPGs, and a LARP.

History 

The first Anime Boston was held in 2003 at the Boston Park Plaza, as was the 2004 convention. By Anime Boston 2005, the convention had moved to the Hynes Convention Center and Sheraton Boston Hotel.  Since then, the convention has continued to be held at the convention center and adjoining hotels with attendance seeing steady growth to 14,339 people (or 35,224 turnstile) in 2008.  That year also saw Japanese rock stars The Pillows finish up the east coast leg of their American tour at Anime Boston. In 2009, the convention saw the attendance rise to over 15,000 people for the first time, and the attendees who got tickets at the convention for the concert got to see Kalafina for their first-ever North American performance. Attendance jumped again to over 17,000 attendants in 2010. Nobuo Uematsu made an appearance at the convention, with the Video Game Orchestra, a Boston-based 90-piece orchestra that performs video game music with an orchestra, choir, and rock band.

In 2011, the Boston Phoenix selected Anime Boston as the city's "Best Nerd Gathering", beating out contenders such as New England Comic Con and PAX East.  The convention won the award again in 2012.  In 2012, Anime Boston celebrated its tenth year. In addition to its events, a museum of the convention's history was displayed; photographs and memorabilia such as mascot costumes and previous t-shirt designs, from each of the past years created the museum's exhibits; some of Anime Boston’s guests from previous years also submitted letters of congratulations. Held on the same weekend as Easter, its attendance reached a total of over 20,000 attendees. An attendance cap was announced for weekend memberships for the 2015 convention due to overcrowding concerns, despite this AB plans on being at the Hynes Convention Center through 2026. Anime Boston 2020 and 2021 was cancelled due to the COVID-19 pandemic. Anime Boston returned as an in-person event in 2022, although with fewer guests present.

Event history
Since 2005, Anime Boston has been held at the Hynes Convention Center. The 2003 and 2004 events were held at the Boston Park Plaza.

Mascots

The mascots for Anime Boston are A-chan and B-kun. A-chan has long blue hair and she typically wears a dress. B-kun has orange hair and red eyes.  Their outfits often change to match the convention's theme for the year.

See also
 New England Anime Society
 List of anime conventions

References

External links

 Official Anime Boston web site
 Official New England Anime Society web site, Anime Boston's parent organization

Anime conventions in the United States
Recurring events established in 2003
Annual events in Boston
Culture of Boston
Conventions in Boston
2003 establishments in Massachusetts